The Church of the Immaculate Conception, in Huzhuang village, Pingyin county of Jinan, Shandong province, is a Catholic church registered with the Catholic Patriotic Association. It is popularly known as the Huzhuang Church or Huzhuang Catholic Church.

The church was designed in 1909 by a German priest, but was destroyed on Christmas Day in 1965. The current building was rebuilt in 1998. Along with the Church of Our Lady of Lourdes, atop a nearby hill, the Huzhuang Church receives about 100,000 pilgrims each year. The church is known for its Chinese Catholic folk music.

References

See also 
 List of sites in Jinan

Roman Catholic churches in China
Roman Catholic churches completed in 1909
Major National Historical and Cultural Sites in Shandong
Catholic Patriotic Association
20th-century Roman Catholic church buildings in China